Anand Shankar is an Indian film director and screenwriter, primarily working in Tamil cinema. Shankar started his career as an assistant director to Siddharth Anand in Anjaana Anjaani (2010). He also assisted producer-director AR Murugadoss in movies such as Thuppakki and 7aum Arivu. He successfully finished his work as debut director on Arima Nambi starring Vikram Prabhu and Priya Anand, a Tamil thriller film. He directed Iru Mugan and Arima Nambi, both of them became blockbusters at the box-office. In 2018, he directed NOTA, starring Vijay Devarkonda in his Tamil debut. The film was released on October 5, 2018.

Early life 
Anand Shankar is the grandson of National Award Winning playwright Komal Swaminathan. Anand Shankar got a mechanical engineering degree in Chennai from Sri Venkateswara College of Engineering (SVCE), after which he studied Film Making at the New York Film Academy.

Personal life
He is married to Divyanka Jeevanantham.

Filmography 

Director

Actor
7aam Arivu - Music shop employee

References 

Tamil-language film directors
Tamil screenwriters
Film directors from Tamil Nadu
Living people
21st-century Indian film directors
1986 births
New York Film Academy alumni
Anna University alumni